Closia is a genus of sea snails, marine gastropod mollusks in the subfamily Pruninae of the family Marginellidae, the margin snails.

Species
Species within the genus Closia include:
 † Closia cenchridium Le Renard & van Nieulande, 1985 
 † Closia chevallieri Le Renard & van Nieulande, 1985 
 † Closia convergens Le Renard & van Nieulande, 1985 
 Closia giadae Cossignani, 2001
 † Closia inadspecta Le Renard & van Nieulande, 1985 
 Closia limpida Bozzetti, 1992
 Closia majuscula (Martens, 1877)
 Closia princeps (G.B. Sowerby III, 1901)
 † Closia pseudampulla Le Renard & van Nieulande, 1985 
 Closia sarda (Kiener, 1834)
Species brought into synonymy
 † Closia aucklandica Dell, 1950 : synonym of † Archierato aucklandica (Dell, 1950)  (original combination)
 Closia lilacina (G.B. Sowerby II, 1846): synonym of Bullata lilacina (G.B. Sowerby II, 1846)
 Closia manceli Jousseaume, 1875: synonym of Cystiscus manceli (Jousseaume, 1875)
 Closia maoria Powell, 1937: synonym of Ovaginella maoria (Powell, 1937)

References

 Cossignani T. (2006). Marginellidae & Cystiscidae of the World. L'Informatore Piceno. 408pp.
 Bozzetti L. (2013) Note on the genus Closia Gray, 1857 (Marginellidae, Marginellinae). Malacologia Mostra Mondiale 78: 13-17.

External links
 Revision of the supraspecific classification of marginelliform gastropods; The Nautilus v.109 p. 43-110
 J. Le Renard & F.A.D. van Nieulande,  Mededelingen van de Werkgroep voor Tertiaire en Kwartaire Geologie, vol 22 (1985) nr. 1 p. 3-69

Marginellidae
Gastropod genera